The Betty Hutton Show is an American sitcom that aired from October 1, 1959, until June 30, 1960, on CBS's Thursday schedule (8-8:30 pm Eastern). The show was sponsored by General Foods' Post Cereals, and was produced by Desilu and Hutton Productions.

The series, which was originally entitled Goldie, would retain its original title during its syndication run.

Synopsis
Hutton stars as Goldie, a showgirl-turned-manicurist. One of Goldie's regular customers is a millionaire, Mr. Strickland. After he suddenly dies, Goldie discovers that he has left everything he owns, including his $60 million fortune and his three children, to her. The children were a 12-year-old boy and girl and boy teenagers.

Cast and characters

Guest stars included Don Grady, Dennis Hopper, Phil Harris, and Cesar Romero.

Production 
In addition to being the star, Hutton "insisted on creative control of everything from writing to directing to designing", which resulted in the resignations of three producers and two directors. Becker wrote, "by the season's midpoint, Hutton was largely producing the show alone".

Stanley Roberts created The Betty Hutton Show., and William Harmon was a producer. Directors included Jodie Copeland, Jerry Hopper, Richard Kinon, and Robert Sidney. Writers included Ralph Goodman, Ed Jurist, Bob Kaufman, Kip King, Philip Lloyd, Laurence Marks, Marvin Marx, and Jack Wilson. Jerry Fielding composed the theme song.

Thirty episodes were filmed in black and white with a laugh track. Hutton owned the company that produced the program, which was filmed by Desilu. Post Cereals sponsored the program.

Reception and cancellation
Although Hutton was a popular actress, the show only lasted for thirty episodes before being cancelled, mainly because it was scheduled opposite ABC's popular series The Donna Reed Show. In a short review of the first episode, John P. Shanley wrote in The New York Times, "Miss Hutton worked conscientiously but the show was just another trifling addition to television's roster of mediocre situation comedies."

Christine Becker, in her book It's the Pictures That Got Small: Hollywood Film Stars on 1950s Television, wrote that the show's premise of combining sudden single parenthood with inheriting millions of dollars "was decidedly unconventional at a time when domestic sitcoms were supposed to feature an approximation of the cohesive, middle-class suburban nuclear family so desired by sponsors and networks."

Episodes

DVD release
Four episodes of the show were released on DVD by Alpha Video on July 31, 2007.

References

External links
  
 Episodes on the Internet Archive: "Goldie Goes Broke" (November 5, 1959), "Art For Goldie's Sake" (December 3, 1959), "Roy Runs Away" (January 21, 1960), "The Seaton Story" (March 10, 1960), "Gullible Goldie" (March 31, 1960)

1959 American television series debuts
1960 American television series endings
1950s American sitcoms
1960s American sitcoms
CBS original programming
Black-and-white American television shows
English-language television shows
Television series by CBS Studios
Television series by Desilu Productions
Inheritances in fiction